K-43 is a  state highway in the U.S. state of Kansas. The highway runs from K-4 in Hope north to Interstate 70 (I-70) and U.S. Route 40 (US-40) north of Detroit. The entire highway is located within Dickinson County. K-43 is maintained by the Kansas Department of Transportation (KDOT), and is a relatively minor highway. K-43 is not part of the National Highway System. The highway was established around 1932, with the northern terminus being the now decommissioned US-40S. In 1962, the route was extended north a bit to a new diamond interchange with I-70.

Route description

K-43 begins at an intersection with K-4 at the northern city limit of Hope. The highway heads north for about  before turning west and entering the small community of Navarre. The route crosses the BNSF Railway and turns to the north, continuing through flat farmland. The highway crosses the railway again before entering the city of Enterprise. In Enterprise, K-43 turns east along 5th Street, then north onto Factory Street. The highway curves northwest and crosses the BNSF Railway a third time before crossing the Smoky Hill River. This river crossing replaces a  truss bridge located two blocks to the west on Bridge Street, constructed in 1924, and demolished circa 1987.

Upon crossing this bridge, K-43 leaves Enterprise. The route bends to the north and crosses the BNSF Railway a fourth and final time. Continuing north through level plains, K-43 meets a railroad operated by Union Pacific and comes to an intersection with its former northern terminus at an old alignment of US-40. At this intersection, the route turns to the northeast and travels through the community of Detroit before turning back to the north. North of here, K-43 meets its northern terminus at a diamond interchange with I-70 and US-40.

All but  of K-43's alignment is maintained by the Kansas Department of Transportation (KDOT). The entire section within Enterprise is maintained by the city. The traffic numbers on the route in 2012, measured in annual average daily traffic, were relatively low compared to other state highways. Between 185 and 1900 vehicles traveled the highway each day, including between 30 and 95 trucks. The most traffic was present in the segment of the highway between Enterprise and Detroit. No segment of K-43 is included in the National Highway System, a system of highways considered to be important to the nation's defense, economy, and mobility.

History
K-43 first appears on the 1932 state highway map. At that time it followed largely the same alignment it does today, running from K-4 in Hope to an intersection with what was then US-40S. Most of the road was dirt, but it was paved with gravel from Enterprise north to its northern terminus. By 1936, the whole route had been upgraded to gravel pavement. In 1945, the portion north of Enterprise was paved. The entire highway had been paved by 1956. In 1962, the highway was extended slightly to the north, moving its northern terminus from US-40 to an interchange with the newly constructed I-70. The route has not changed significantly since 1962.

Major intersections

References

External links

Kansas Highways Routelog - K-43

043
Transportation in Dickinson County, Kansas